Elizabeth Bay may refer to:
Elizabeth Bay, New South Wales, a harbourside suburb in eastern Sydney, New South Wales, Australia
Elisabeth Bay, Isabela Island (Ecuador), a natural bay on the coast of Isabela Island, Galapagos.
Elizabeth Bay, Namibia (formerly Elisabethbucht) is a ghost town in southern Namibia.

See also
Elizabeth Bay House, a historic home in the suburb of Elizabeth Bay, Sydney Australia.